Eduard Kerschbaumer (19 May 1920 – October 1995) was an Austrian boxer. He competed in the men's featherweight event at the 1948 Summer Olympics.

References

1920 births
1995 deaths
Austrian male boxers
Olympic boxers of Austria
Boxers at the 1948 Summer Olympics
Place of birth missing
Featherweight boxers
20th-century Austrian people